"Down for My N's" (written and stylized as Down 4 My N's on the Snoop Dogg releases) is a song by C-Murder featuring Snoop Dogg and Magic from Dogg's fourth album, No Limit Top Dogg and C-Murder's Trapped in Crime. Kanye West included an interpolation of this song in his song "Blood on the Leaves", and Khia included an interpolation for her song "Fuck Dem Other Hoes" from her debut album. Monica also sampled "Down 4 My N's" on her song "If U Were the Girl" off her 2002 album All Eyez on Me. It contains a sample of "Ike's Mood" by singer Isaac Hayes.

Chart performance

In popular culture
The song is featured in the 2008 film, Street Kings.
The song was used by the Miami Heat during player introductions.
The song has become the unofficial anthem of the Alabama Crimson Tide football team.
Prince Fielder, while he was a member of the Detroit Tigers, used the song as his primary walk up music during home games.
The song was referenced by Kendrick Lamar in his song "Tammy's Song (Her Evils)" on his debut album Section.80.
The song was performed by Jay–Z and Beyoncé at their On the Run II tour in 2018.

References

https://www.youtube.com/watch?v=iD9v7EEXJKw

1999 songs
1999 singles
Songs written by Snoop Dogg
Snoop Dogg songs
Priority Records singles
Gangsta rap songs